Bollywood may refer to a number of tree species:

Cinnamomum baileyanum, brown Bollywood 
Lindera queenslandica, Bollywood
Litsea bindoniana, big-leaf Bollywood, round-leaf Bollywood
Litsea breviumbellata, brown Bollywood, rusty-leaf Bollywood 
Litsea connorsii, Bollywood
Litsea fawcettiana, brown Bollywood
Litsea glutinosa, brown Bollywood
Litsea granitica, Bollywood
Litsea leefeana, brown Bollywood, big-leaf Bollywood
Litsea reticulata,	brown Bollywood
Neolitsea m, grey Bollywood
Neolitsea brassii, grey Bollywood
Neolitsea cassia, grey Bollywood
Neolitsea dealbata, grey Bollywood, velvet-leaf Bollywood, white Bollywood

See also
Bollygum

References